The 2019 FIA European Truck Racing Championship is a motor-racing championship using highly tuned tractor units. It is the 35th year of the championship. The eight-round season began May 25 at the Misano World Circuit and ended October 6 at the Circuito del Jarama. Jochen Hahn dominated the season en route to his sixth career ETRC championship, securing the title one round early at the Bugatti Circuit in France.

Teams and drivers

 Drivers who did not participate in any of the first five events of the championship are not eligible to score points.

Calendar and winners
All rounds from the 2018 season returned for 2019. A switch in order between the rounds in Slovakia and Germany was the only change in the schedule from the preceding year.

Championship standings

Drivers championship

Each round or racing event consists of four races. At each race, points are awarded to the top ten classified finishers using the following structure:

Notes
 Races 3 and 4 at Autodrom Most cancelled due to heavy rain.

Grammer Truck Cup

{|
| valign="top" |

 Races 3 and 4 at Autodrom Most were cancelled due to heavy rain.

External links

References

2019 European Truck Racing Championship
2019 in motorsport
Truck Racing